Progress M-12 was a Russian uncrewed cargo spacecraft which was launched in 1992 to resupply the Mir space station. The thirtieth of sixty four Progress spacecraft to visit Mir, it used the Progress-M 11F615A55 configuration, and had the serial number 213. It carried supplies including food, water and oxygen for the EO-11 crew aboard Mir, as well as equipment for conducting scientific research, and fuel for adjusting the station's orbit and performing manoeuvres.

Progress M-12 was launched at 21:29:25 GMT on 19 April 1992, atop a Soyuz-U2 carrier rocket flying from Site 1/5 at the Baikonur Cosmodrome. Following two days of free flight, it docked with the Forward port of the core module of Mir at 23:21:59 GMT on 21 April. Progress M-12 undocked from Mir at 21:34:44 GMT on 27 June, and was deorbited few hours later, to a destructive reentry over the Pacific Ocean at around 00:02:51 the next day.

See also

1992 in spaceflight
List of Progress flights
List of uncrewed spaceflights to Mir

References

Spacecraft launched in 1992
Progress (spacecraft) missions